The Department of Arts, Heritage and Environment was an Australian government department that existed between December 1984 and July 1987.

Scope
Information about the department's functions and/or government funding allocation could be found in the Administrative Arrangements Orders, the annual Portfolio Budget Statements and in the Department's annual reports.

At the department's creation it was responsible for:
Environment and conservation
Cultural affairs, including support for the arts
National collections
National heritage.

Structure
The Department was a Commonwealth Public Service department, staffed by officials who were responsible to the Minister for Arts, Heritage and the Environment.

References

Arts, Heritage and Environment
Ministries established in 1984
1984 establishments in Australia
1987 disestablishments in Australia
Australia